Galeruca rudis is a species of skeletonizing leaf beetle in the family Chrysomelidae. It is found in North America.

References

Further reading

 
 

Galerucinae
Articles created by Qbugbot
Taxa named by John Lawrence LeConte
Beetles described in 1857
Beetles of North America